The Cook County, Illinois, general election was held on November 8, 1988.

Primaries were held March 15, 1988.

Elections were held for Clerk of the Circuit Court, Recorder of Deeds, State's Attorney, one seat on the Cook County Board of Appeals, three seats on the Water Reclamation District Board, and judgeships on the Circuit Court of Cook County.

Election information
1988 was a presidential election year in the United States. The primaries and general elections for Cook County races coincided with those for federal races (President and House) and those for state elections.

Voter turnout

Primary election
Turnout in the primaries was 45.63%, with 1,236,750 ballots cast.

General election
The general election saw turnout of 72.56%, with 2,095,985 ballots cast. Chicago saw 1,14,080 ballots cast, and suburban Cook County saw 981,905 ballots cast.

Straight-ticket voting
Ballots had a straight-ticket voting option in 1988.

Clerk of the Circuit Court 

In the 1988 Clerk of the Circuit Court of Cook County election,  incumbent clerk Morgan M. Finley, a Democrat, did not seek reelection. Democrat Aurelia Pucinski was elected to succeed him.

Primaries

Democratic
Candidates
The following candidates ran for the Democratic Party nomination for Clerk of the Circuit Court:

Results

Republican
Candidate
The following candidate ran for the Republican Party nomination for Clerk of the Circuit Court:

Results

Illinois Solidarity
No candidates ran in the Illinois Solidarity Party primary.

General election

Recorder of Deeds 

In the 1988 Cook County Recorder of Deeds election, incumbent first-term recorder of deeds Harry Yourell, a Democrat, did not seek reelection, instead running to be a commissioner of the Metropolitan Water Reclamation District of Greater Chicago. Democrat Carol Moseley Braun was elected to succeed him.

Mosely Braun's election made her the first African-American to hold the office of Cook County recorder of deeds.

Primaries

Democratic
Candidates
The following candidate ran for the Democratic Party nomination for Cook County Recorder of Deeds Court:

Results

Republican
Candidates
The following candidate ran for the Democratic Party nomination for Cook County Recorder of Deeds Court:

Results

Illinois Solidarity
No candidates ran in the Illinois Solidarity Party primary. The party ultimately nominated Edward M. Wojkowski.

General election

State's Attorney 

In the 1988 Cook County State's Attorney election, incumbent second-term state's attorney Richard M. Daley, a Democrat, was reelected.

Primaries

Democratic

Republican

Illinois Solidarity
No candidates ran in the Illinois Solidarity Party primary.

General election

Cook County Board of Appeals (special election)

In the 1988 Cook County Board of Appeals special election, one seat on the board were up for election. Due to the death of Harry Semrow, this special election was held to fill the seat he had served on. Democrat Joseph Berrios was elected to fill the seat.

Thomas A. Jaconetty had been appointed to hold the seat until the new commissioner elected in this race would be seated.

Primaries

Democratic
31st Ward committeeman Joseph Berrios, the Democratic Party organization-endorsed candidate, won the Democratic primary.

Republican

Illinois Solidarity
No candidates ran in the Illinois Solidarity Party primary.

General election

Water Reclamation District Board 

In the 1988 Metropolitan Water Reclamation District of Greater Chicago election, three of the nine seats on the Metropolitan Water Reclamation District of Greater Chicago board were up for election in an at-large election. All three Democratic nominees won.

Judicial elections 
Pasrtisan elections were held for judgeships on the Circuit Court of Cook County due to vacancies. Retention elections were also held for the Circuit Court.

Other elections
Coinciding with the primaries, elections were held to elect the Democratic, Republican, and Illinois Solidarity committeemen for the wards of Chicago.

See also 
 1988 Illinois elections

References 

Cook County
Cook County, Illinois elections
Cook County 1988
Richard M. Daley
Cook County
Cook County, Illinois elections